Mark Suster is an American entrepreneur and venture capitalist. He is a managing partner at Upfront Ventures, the largest venture capital firm in Los Angeles. Suster is a prominent blogger in the startup venture capital world.

Career 
In 1999, with Ireland-based property entrepreneur Brian Moran, he founded his first company, a construction collaboration technology business called BuildOnline, where he was also chief executive officer. BuildOnline merged with US-based rival Citadon in December 2006.

By April 2007, Suster had already left Citadon, having founded a second company (Koral, a content collaboration software business). In April 2007, Koral was acquired by Salesforce.com where Suster took the role of Vice President, Product Management.

Suster joined Upfront Ventures (previously known as GRP Partners), an investment firm, in 2007. At Upfront, Suster leads investments in companies including Bird, Invoca, MakeSpace, mitu, Nanit, Osmo, Tact, and uBeam.

Suster also led the initial funding round for, and was on the board of, Maker Studios (acquired by Disney in 2014).

Personal 
Suster grew up in Northern California and is a dual citizen of both the United Kingdom and the United States. He is of Romanian Jewish descent. Suster graduated from the University of California, San Diego with a Bachelor of Arts in Economics. He received his MBA from the University of Chicago.

Suster is married with two children.

References 

Accenture people
American investors
American venture capitalists
American people of Romanian-Jewish descent
Angel investors
Living people
University of California, San Diego alumni
1968 births